Caleb Pressley (born November 13, 1992) is an American blogger, podcaster, and interviewer for the sports and pop culture blog Barstool Sports. In college, Pressley was a quarterback on the North Carolina Tar Heels football team. He hosts the Sundae Conversations series on the Barstool Sports Youtube channel.

Early life and education 
Pressley was born to Bill and Heather Lee Pressley – his father was a race car driver. His uncle Robert and cousin Coleman were former NASCAR drivers.

Pressley attended A. C. Reynolds High School in his hometown of Asheville, North Carolina, where he played American football as quarterback for 4 years. He attended high school with country music singers Luke Combs and Chase Rice. He also played basketball and ran track and field for 3 years. In football, Pressley guided his team to the North Carolina 4-A state championship in 2009, where he was named the game's MVP. He was voted as First-team All-Western N.C. in 2009 and All-Conference in 2010. In total, he passed for 4,385 yards, 39 touchdowns and ran for 1,414 yards and 22 touchdowns during his high school career.

College 
Pressley was a walk-on quarterback for the NCAA Division I North Carolina Tar Heels football team starting in 2010. Pressley played two games in total before leaving on exchange at the University of Edinburgh in 2014 and retiring immediately upon his return. He was given an assistant manager role with the football team, where he had the unofficial title Supervisor of Morale, where he was entrusted with signalling plays as well as improving the morale of the team.

Barstool Sports 
Pressley received national attention with his role as Supervisor of Morale of the North Carolina Tar Heels football team. In 2015, he was offered a role with the blog website Barstool Sports after his graduation, after an interview they had with him. In 2016, he launched the Dixie Tour with Barstool Sports, a project providing coverage of college football across America. That same year he was also involved in a podcast called "Young & Happy". In 2020, he started his own podcast called 51 Strokes, as he went on a journey to become a professional golf player. Pressley is a regular interviewer for Barstool Sports, with various viral videos with celebrities.

Appearances in media

Podcasts 

 Young & Happy [with Adam Ferrone] (2016–2019)
 The Caleb Pressley Show (2016)
 51 Strokes (2020–2022)
 Sundae Conversation (2021–present)

Filmography

References

External links

1992 births
Living people
21st-century American comedians
Artists from Asheville, North Carolina
Sportspeople from Asheville, North Carolina
American male comedians
American podcasters
American football quarterbacks
Barstool Sports people
Comedians from North Carolina
Players of American football from North Carolina
North Carolina Tar Heels football players